The 2013 Safeway Championship was held from February 6 to 10 at the Yellowhead Centre in Neepawa, Manitoba. The winning Jeff Stoughton rink represented Manitoba at the 2013 Tim Hortons Brier in Edmonton, Alberta.

Teams

Draw Brackets
32 team double knockout with playoff round
Four teams qualify each from A Event and B Event

A Event

B Event

Results
All draw times are listed in Central Standard Time (UTC−6).

Draw 1
February 6, 8:30am

Draw 2
February 6, 12:15pm

Draw 3
February 6, 4:00pm

Draw 4
February 6, 8:15pm

Draw 5
February 7, 8:30am

Draw 6
February 7, 12:15pm

Draw 7
February 7, 4:00pm

Draw 8
February 7, 7:45pm

Draw 9
February 8, 8:30am

Draw 10
February 8, 12:15pm

Draw 11
February 8, 4:00pm

Playoffs

Playoff round
8 team double knockout
Four teams qualify into Championship Round

First round
February 8, 7:45pm

Second round
February 9, 9:00am

Third round
February 9, 2:00pm

Championship Round

1 vs. 2
February 9, 6:30 PM

3 vs. 4
February 9, 6:30 PM

Semifinal
February 10, 9:00 AM

Final
February 10, 1:30 PM

References

External links

2013 Tim Hortons Brier
2013 in Manitoba
Curling in Manitoba
February 2013 sports events in Canada